James Monroe Smith (September 18, 1839 – December 11, 1915) was a millionaire planter and state legislator in Georgia, U.S.

Biography
James Monroe Smith was born near Washington, Georgia on September 18, 1839. His plantation, Smithonia, covered square miles. His property included a railroad to connect his farm with the Georgia Railroad. He served in the Georgia State Legislature's house and senate and ran for governor in 1906 but did not win. He was a bachelor. He died on his plantation in Colbert, Georgia on December 11, 1915. After his death his estate was vigorously disputed.

See also
Howard's Covered Bridge

References

External links
 

1839 births
1915 deaths
People from Wilkes County, Georgia
Members of the Georgia House of Representatives
Georgia (U.S. state) state senators
American planters
People from Oglethorpe County, Georgia
19th-century American politicians